Abigail Byskata (born 7 May 2007) is a Finnish ice hockey player and member of the Finnish national under-18 ice hockey team, currently playing in the Naisten Liiga (NSML) with Team Kuortane.

Playing career
She began competing in the national E2 (under-11 or U11) league with TUS E2 AA (see minor ice hockey) in 2015 and remained with the team through 2017. In the 2017–18 season, she played with the TUS teams in the E2 AA, E1 A (U12 A), and E1 AA (U12 AA) leagues. The 2018–19 season was played with TUS D2 AA and Byskata recorded 21 goals and 12 assists for 33 points in 21 games played, ranking second on the team for points.

International play
Byskata made her debut with the national under-18 team at the 2023 IIHF World Women's U18 Championship. At fifteen years old, she was the youngest skater in the Finnish lineup. She played in all six games but did not record a point.

At the 2023 European Youth Olympic Winter Festival, Byskata captained the Finnish national under-16 team in the girls' ice hockey tournament. She tied Jannika Sten as top goal-scorer on the team, with 3 goals, and ranked third on the team and fourteenth of all tournament skaters for points. In the third place game against Sweden, Byskata netted the only goal of the shootout to secure a bronze medal victory for Finland.

Personal life
Byskata has also played association football with TUS teams and participated in athletics and orienteering.

Career statistics

International

Sources:

References 

2007 births
Living people
Finnish women's ice hockey forwards
People from Kronoby
Swedish-speaking Finns
Team Kuortane players